Karel Dostál (born 7 December 1961) is a Czech bobsledder. He competed in the four man event at the 1992 Winter Olympics.

References

1961 births
Living people
Czech male bobsledders
Olympic bobsledders of Czechoslovakia
Bobsledders at the 1992 Winter Olympics
Place of birth missing (living people)